Pignolata (Sicilian: Pignulata) is a Sicilian pastry, which originated in Messina and is also common in Calabria. It is a soft pastry, covered in chocolate and lemon-flavoured syrup or icing. This pastry is half covered or iced in one flavouring and the other half in the other flavour, which hardens when the pignolata is ready to be served. Each pastry serves several people, and is meant to be cut into small pieces when served. In Sicily, this dessert was made for Carnevale, the last celebration before Lent begins on Ash Wednesday.

Pignolata can be also made of small portions of fried pastry, like large pearls, in a hot honey sauce, with chopped almonds or hazelnuts. Before serving, they are set on a plate,  as a crown, with chopped nuts sprinkled over the top.

See also
Struffoli
Croquembouche
List of doughnut varieties

References

Cuisine of Calabria
Cuisine of Sicily
Italian desserts
Italian doughnuts
Italian pastries
Messina
Cuisine of Messina
Carnival foods